Greenville, West Virginia may refer to:
Greenville, Logan County, West Virginia, an unincorporated community in Logan County
Greenville, Monroe County, West Virginia, an unincorporated community in Monroe County
An alternate name for Greencastle, West Virginia, an unincorporated community in Wirt County